Jim Slater may refer to:

 Jim Slater (accountant) (1929–2015), British investor and business writer
 Jim Slater (footballer) (1884–1970), Australian rules footballer
 Jim Slater (ice hockey) (born 1982), American ice hockey center
 Jim Slater (trade unionist) (1923–1993), Communist and British trade union leader

See also
James Slater (disambiguation)